Przemyślanin is an overnight train (18 hrs needed to complete the route at an average speed of 56 km/h) operated by PKP Intercity, a division of the Polish State Railways, which runs across whole Poland, from southeastern station of Przemyśl Main, to Świnoujście, located in extreme northwestern corner of the country. Rail distance between these locations is 1,008 kilometers, which makes Przemyślanin the train that crosses the longest route within Polish borders. Przemyślanin goes to Świnoujście only in spring and summer, in the period 9/10 April – 28/29 September. Off-season, the train completes its route at the Szczecin Main station.

Route 
 Przemyśl Główny,
 Przemyśl Zasanie,
 Jarosław,
 Rzeszów,
 Dębica,
 Tarnów,
 Bochnia,
 Kraków Płaszów,
 Kraków Główny,
 Trzebinia,
 Jaworzno-Szczakowa,
 Mysłowice,
 Katowice,
 Zabrze,
 Gliwice,
 Kędzierzyn-Koźle,
 Opole Główne,
 Wrocław Główny,
 Rawicz,
 Leszno,
 Poznań Główny,
 Wronki,
 Krzyż,
 Choszczno,
 Stargard,
 Szczecin Dąbie,
 Szczecin Główny,
 Goleniów
 Międzyzdroje
 Świnoujście.

References 

Named passenger trains of Poland